Tamara Nikolayevna Moskvina (née Bratus, Братусь; born 26 June 1941) is a Russian pair skating coach and former competitive skater. Competing in pairs with Alexei Mishin, she became the 1969 World silver medalist and Soviet national champion.

As a singles skater, she was a five-time (1962–1966) Soviet national champion. She later became a successful coach, leading at least one pair to an Olympic medal in six consecutive Winter Olympics from 1984 to 2002 and twice coaching the gold and silver medal-winning pairs, in 1992 and 1998. Married to Igor Moskvin, Moskvina is based in Saint Petersburg, Russia.

Early life
Tamara Nikolayevna Bratus was born 26 June 1941 in Leningrad (now Saint Petersburg), the daughter of Serafima and Nikolay Bratus. She had two sisters. During the Siege of Leningrad in World War II, her family evacuated to a small village in the Ural Mountains where her mother had relatives. Moskvina grew to only  due to childhood malnutrition during the war years. The family returned to Leningrad in 1948. Her father, from Kyiv, died suddenly at the age of 47.

Career

As a skater
Moskvina began skating in Leningrad at the age of 10, after her father obtained used skates for his daughters. Ivan Bogoyavlensky was her first coach. She practiced at the Iskra and Dinamo rinks, the latter of which was on a tennis court. Igor Moskvin became her coach in 1957. She moved to an ice rink on Vasilyevsky Island which opened in 1958 after conversion from an abandoned church.

Moskvina became the Soviet national ladies' champion for the first time in 1962 and would win the title four more times. Her best finish at an international competition in singles was 14th at the 1965 European Championships. Moskvina may have been the first to perform what is now called a Biellmann spin. She was inspired after seeing a gymnastics competition and began attempting it on the ice. She included the spin at the 1960 European Championships.

At Moskvin's suggestion, she decided to try pair skating. As he later explained, the leading women's coach in those years was Tatiana Granatkina-Tolmacheva, who worked in Moscow and led a group of girls of the same age as Moskvina. Tatiana's husband, Alexander Tolmachev, headed the Figure Skating Federation of Moscow, so Moskvina, who did not train under Tolmacheva, had little chance to stay in the team. Her first partner was Alexander Gavrilov, with whom she won the 1965 Soviet national title. He retired at the end of the season.

Later in 1965, Moskvina teamed up with Alexei Mishin, whom she had trained alongside when they were both singles skaters. They won bronze at the 1966 Winter Universiade and were sent to their first European and World Championships in 1967. Yubileyny Sports Palace became their training site after its opening in 1967.

Moskvina/Mishin won silver at the 1968 European Championships. The following season, they defeated both the two-time Olympic gold medallists, Ludmila Belousova/Oleg Protopopov, and the future champions, Irina Rodnina/Alexei Ulanov, to win the Soviet national title. Moskvina/Mishin took bronze at the 1969 European Championships and then silver at the 1969 World Championships. Moskvina decided to retire from competition in 1969 to start a family.

As a coach
Moskvina became interested in a coaching career during her competitive years. She earned her doctorate in educational psychology from the Leningrad Academy of Physical Culture.

Moskvina has coached at the Yubileyny Sports Palace in Saint Petersburg, Russia, for almost her entire career. She was one of the first Soviet coaches to collaborate with the skating world outside the Soviet Union and its satellites. She contributed a report on the 1970 European Championships to Skating Magazine, an American publication, which at that time required clearance through the central news agency in the Soviet Union. She co-authored the International Skating Union's judging handbook for pair skating in 1984. During the 1990s, Yubileyny suffered from poor-quality ice and other problems, resulting in limited training time even for top skaters.

In 1998, Moskvina and her students spent some time at the Stamford Twin Rinks in Stamford, Connecticut. In 1999, Moskvina moved to Hackensack, New Jersey's Ice House and spent several years coaching there. In 2001–2002, she returned to Yubileyny where she continues to coach. Since 2017 she has been working at the Ice Arena skating rink in St. Petersburg

In the 2022–23 season, Moskvina is coaching the following pairs:

 Aleksandra Boikova / Dmitrii Kozlovskii – 2021 World bronze medalists, 2020 European champions, 2020 Russian champions and 2019, 2021, 2022 prize-winners, 2019 European bronze medalists, 2019 Skate Canada and Rostelecom Cup champions, 2021 Internationaux de France champions.
Anastasia Mishina / Aleksandr Galliamov (since 2020) – 2022 Olympic champions in Team event, 2022 Olympic bronze medalists, 2021 World champions, 2022 Russian champions, 2021 Rostelecom Cup and NHK Trophy champions.
Yasmina Kadyrova / Valerii Kolesov 

Moskvina coached the following pairs:
 Irina Vorobieva/Alexander Vlassov – 1977 World & European silver medalists, 1976 World & European bronze medalists.
 Irina Vorobieva/Igor Lisovsky – 1981 World and European champions. She coached Vorobieva from age ten.
 Elena Valova/Oleg Vasiliev – 1984 Olympic champions, 1988 Olympic silver medalists, and 1983, 1985, & 1988 World champions. She first worked with Vasiliev when he was twelve.
 Natalia Mishkutenok/Artur Dmitriev – 1992 Olympic champions, 1994 Olympic silver medalists, and 1991 & 1992 World champions.
 Elena Bechke/Denis Petrov – 1992 Olympic silver medalists, 1989 World bronze medalists, two-time European silver medalists.
 Oksana Kazakova/Artur Dmitriev – 1998 Olympic champions and 1996 European champions.
 Elena Berezhnaya/Anton Sikharulidze –  2002 Olympic champions, 1998 Olympic silver medalists, and 1998 & 1999 World champions.
 Yuko Kawaguchi/Alexander Markuntsov – 2001 World Junior silver medalist.
 Kyoko Ina/John Zimmerman – Three-time U.S. champions and 2002 World bronze medalists.
 Julia Obertas/Sergei Slavnov – 2005 European silver medalists.
 Yuko Kavaguti/Alexander Smirnov – 2009 & 2010 World bronze medalists, 2010 & 2015 European champions, 2008, 2009 & 2010 Russian national champions.
Alisa Efimova/Alexander Korovin – 2019 Universiade champions, 2018 Skate America silver medalists.
Yasmina Kadyrova / Ivan Balchenko  – 2021 Rostelecom Cup bronze medalists.

Moskvina coached some pairs in collaboration with her husband, Igor Moskvin (Kyoko Ina/John Zimmerman), and some with former students Artur Dmitriev and Oksana Kazakova. Her pairs have worked with various choreographers, including Alexander Matveev, Tatiana Druchinina (until 2011), Valeri Pecherski, Igor Bobrin, and Peter Tchernyshev. Former student Oleg Vasiliev coached Tatiana Totmianina/Maxim Marinin to an Olympic gold medal after Moskvina sent them to him.

During her own skating career, both in singles and in pairs, Moskvina was known for including unusual flexibility moves in her programs. She has passed this on in the choreography for the various pair teams she has coached, inventing many unique pair skating elements in which the man and woman, although performing different movements, still work together as a unit. This style of choreography is sometimes referred to as "opposition choreography," as opposed to shadow or mirror skating, when the two partners perform similar movements in unison together.

In 2011, Moskvina said she planned to retire after the 2014 Olympics but would continue to advise pairs in addition to writing a book on her coaching experiences. But she continued to work as a coach. In 2021, Moskvina said about similar plans after the 2022 Olympics,  but continues to coach skaters in the 2022-23 season.

Tamara Moskvina Figure Skating Club 
In March 2017, the Tamara Moskvina Figure Skating Club opened in St. Petersburg. Moskvina is the head of the club and the pair skating coach. In the club there are coaches of pair and single skating Artur Minchuk, Oleg Vasiliev, Veronika Daineko, Alexander Ustinov, Dmitri Khromin, choreographers Alexander Stepin, Nikolai Moroshkin, figure skaters Anastasia Mishina/Aleksandr Galliamov (since 2020), Aleksandra Boikova/Dmitrii Kozlovskii, Petr Gumennik and others. Since 2019, Moskvina has been a consultant to Petr Gumennik. In 2020, Oleg Vasiliev left the Moskvina club. He became the head coach of the Belarusian national team. Alexander Stepin died on February 11, 2021. Since 2021, the choreographer of the Mariinsky Theatre Dmitry Pimonov has been working with figure skaters of the Moskvina club, for example, Petr Gumennik.

According to the coach Veronika Daineko, Moskvina comes to trainings of the single skating group. She gives advice on programs, choreography, presentation. After the Russian championship 2022, Petr Gumennik said that Moskvina works with him and the pair skaters.

Personal life
Tamara Nikolayevna Bratus married Igor Moskvin in 1964. Moskvin died on November 10, 2020. They have two daughters, Olga Igorevna Moskvina (born 12 April 1970), a linguist, and Anna Igorevna Moskvina (born 14 June 1974), an economist who graduated from Columbia University (NYC).

Competitive highlights

Pair skating with Mishin

Pair skating with Gavrilov

Single skating

Awards

Moskvina was inducted into the World Figure Skating Hall of Fame in 2005.

 Order of Merit for the Fatherland, 3rd class (27 February 1998) - for outstanding athletic achievement at the XVIII Olympic Winter Games in 1998
 Order of the Red Banner of Labour (1984)
 Order of Friendship of Peoples (1988)
 Honoured Artist of the RSFSR (22 April 1994) - for services in the development of physical culture and sports and the great personal contribution to the preparation and conduct of XVII Winter Olympic Games in 1994
 Honoured Worker of Physical Culture of the Russian Federation (2002)
 Honoured Master of Sports of the USSR (1969)
 Honoured coach of the USSR
 Honoured Coach of Russia
 Gratitude of the President of the Russian Federation (5 May 2003) - for the successful preparation of athletes and high achievements in sports at the Games XIX Olympic Games in Salt Lake City
 Honorary citizen of St. Petersburg
 Best in sports in St. Petersburg (St. Petersburg Government, 2 February 2010)
 Honorary Diploma from the Legislative Assembly of Saint Petersburg (2002)

References

1941 births
Living people
Russian figure skating coaches
Soviet figure skating coaches
Soviet female pair skaters
Soviet female single skaters
Figure skaters at the 1968 Winter Olympics
Olympic figure skaters of the Soviet Union
Figure skaters from Saint Petersburg
Recipients of the Order "For Merit to the Fatherland", 3rd class
Honoured Masters of Sport of the USSR
Honored Artists of the RSFSR
Recipients of the Order of Friendship of Peoples
World Figure Skating Championships medalists
European Figure Skating Championships medalists
Merited Coaches of the Soviet Union
Honoured Coaches of Russia
Communist Party of the Soviet Union members
Female sports coaches
Universiade medalists in figure skating
Universiade bronze medalists for the Soviet Union
Competitors at the 1966 Winter Universiade